Eagle Grove is a city in Wright County, Iowa, United States. The population was 3,601 at the time of the 2020 census. Eagle Grove is the largest city in Wright County.

History
Eagle Grove was platted in 1881. It was named from the eagle nests seen by early settlers in a nearby Oak tree grove perched above the bank of the Boone River . In 1851 Mr. N. B. Paine moved to Wright County, purchased property and constructed a log cabin that stood directly west of the grove. The nest was over six feet in diameter. The eagles settled in the nest in the spring and summer of 1855-56, However in the spring of 1857 they were shot and killed by a trapper. Thus Eagle Grove was named in honour of these eagles. .

On February 2, 1973, a natural gas explosion killed 13 people and leveled the Chatterbox Cafe and the neighboring Coast to Coast hardware store at the southeast corner of Broadway Street and Commerce Avenue.

Geography
Eagle Grove is located near the Boone River.

Climate

Demographics

2010 census
As of the census of 2010, there were 3,583 people, 1,500 households, and 924 families residing in the city. The racial makeup of the city was 95.5% White, 0.7% African American, 0.1% Asian, 1.8% from other races, and 1.8% from two or more races. Hispanic or Latino of any race were 8.9% of the population.

There were 1,500 households, of which 29.6% had children under the age of 18 living with them, 44.7% were married couples living together, 11.1% had a female householder with no husband present, 5.9% had a male householder with no wife present, and 38.4% were non-families. 32.4% of all households were made up of individuals, and 15.9% had someone living alone who was 65 years of age or older. The average household size was 2.35 and the average family size was 2.92.

The median age in the city was 41 years. 24.3% of residents were under the age of 18; 8.4% were between the ages of 18 and 24; 21.7% were from 25 to 44; 26.3% were from 45 to 64; and 19.4% were 65 years of age or older. The gender makeup of the city was 49.0% male and 51.0% female.

2000 census

As of the census of 2000, there were 3,712 people, 1,511 households, and 994 families residing in the city. The racial makeup of the city was 97.33% White, 0.16% African American, 0.05% Native American, 0.08% Asian, 1.35% from other races, and 1.02% from two or more races. Hispanic or Latino of any race were 2.05% of the population.

There were 1,511 households, out of which 29.8% had children under the age of 18 living with them, 53.7% were married couples living together, 8.5% had a female householder with no husband present, and 34.2% were non-families. 30.1% of all households were made up of individuals, and 14.9% had someone living alone who was 65 years of age or older. The average household size was 2.39 and the average family size was 2.96.

Age spread: 25.7% under the age of 18, 6.9% from 18 to 24, 25.1% from 25 to 44, 21.7% from 45 to 64, and 20.6% who were 65 years of age or older. The median age was 40 years. For every 100 females, there were 93.0 males. For every 100 females age 18 and over, there were 89.2 males.

The median income for a household in the city was $35,505, and the median income for a family was $42,757. Males had a median income of $30,930 versus $19,487 for females. The per capita income for the city was $20,563. About 2.8% of families and 5.7% of the population were below the poverty line, including 3.8% of those under age 18 and 6.0% of those age 65 or over.

Arts and culture
Eagle Grove is one of the few non-county-seat towns in Iowa to be home of the county fair. The Wright County District Junior Fair is held in early July each summer in Greenwood Park and brings people from the region to Eagle Grove. Recent improvements have been made to the fair grounds as the Wright County Fair continues to expand.

Education
The Eagle Grove Community School District serves children from PreK to 12th grade. The district covers area of Wright, Humboldt, and Webster counties, and serves the communities of Eagle Grove, Thor, Vincent, Woolstock, and the surrounding rural areas. There are 836 students in grades K-12. The district has built a new P/K-4 elementary school attached to the middle school after approving a bond referendum.

School sports
Eagle Grove High School is a member of the Iowa High School Athletic Association and competes in an athletic conference called the Top of Iowa Conference. The conference consists of 18 schools that are in 1A & 2A.

Notable people

Robert D. Blue (1898–1989) 30th Governor of Iowa from 1945-49
Frances Lee, a silent film actress
Alvin Setzepfandt, veterinarian and Minnesota politician

References

External links

City website
Eagle Grove Chamber of Commerce

Cities in Iowa
Cities in Wright County, Iowa
1881 establishments in Iowa